The Abarth-Osella 2000 Sport SE-021 is a mid-engined, Group 5 (Sports 2000), prototype race car, built by Osella to compete in the World Sportscar Championship sports car racing series in 1972, and for some races in 1973. The chassis itself was developed and developed by Osella, while the car itself was powered by a  Abarth four-cylinder engine, generating a healthy .

References

Abarth vehicles
Osella vehicles
Mid-engined cars